Adil Osmanović (born 24 July 1963) is a Bosnian politician who served as member of the national House of Representatives from 2019 to 2022. He previously served as Minister of Civil Affairs from 2015 to 2019.

Osmanović has been a member of the Party of Democratic Action since its foundation in 1990 and also served as Vice President of Republika Srpska from 2002 until 2010.

Early life and education
Born in Lukavac, SR Bosnia and Herzegovina, SFR Yugoslavia on 24 July 1963, Osmanović graduated from the Gazi Husrev-beg Madrasa in Sarajevo. He also graduated from the Faculty of Philosophy in Pristina, and received his master's degree from the Faculty of Political Science in Sarajevo.

Career
Osmanović has been a member of the Party of Democratic Action (SDA) since its foundation in 1990. At the party's 6th congress, held on 26 May 2015, he was elected deputy president of the SDA. At the party congress held on 14 September 2019, he was elected Vice President of the SDA.

Until May 1992, Osmanović was a councilor and secretary of the Municipal Assembly of Teslić, when he became the president of the war Presidency of this municipality.

In 2000, he was elected a member of the National Assembly of Republika Srpska, and then two years later, with 34,129 votes, Osmanović won the post of Vice President of Republika Srpska. At the 2006 general election, 22,444 votes were enough for a new term as vice president.

At the 2010 general election, he was the holder of one SDA list for the House of Representatives of the Parliamentary Assembly of Bosnia and Herzegovina, but failed to enter the Parliament. In 2011, Osmanović was appointed Federal Minister of Displaced Persons and Refugees.

At the 2014 general election, he once again won a seat in the National Assembly of Republika Srpska, but instead of a parliamentary seat, Osmanović accepted a position in the executive branch, being appointed Minister of Civil Affairs on 31 March 2015 in the government of Denis Zvizdić. His term as Minister ended on 23 December 2019. Following the 2018 general election, Osmanović was elected a member of the Parliamentary House of Representatives.

Personal life
Adil is married to Nermina Osmanović and together they have two sons. They live in Sarajevo.

References

External links

Official website of the Parliamentary Assembly of Bosnia and Herzegovina

1963 births
Living people
People from Lukavac
Bosniaks of Bosnia and Herzegovina
Academic staff of the University of Sarajevo
Bosniak politicians
Party of Democratic Action politicians
Government ministers of Bosnia and Herzegovina
Members of the House of Representatives (Bosnia and Herzegovina)
Vice presidents of Republika Srpska